John Donovan Cannon (April 24, 1922 – May 20, 2005) was an American actor. An alumnus of the American Academy of Dramatic Arts in New York City, he is best known for his co-starring role of Chief of Detectives Peter B. Clifford in the television series McCloud with Dennis Weaver from 1970 until 1977, and for his part as the witness Lloyd Chandler who cleared Dr. Richard Kimble (David Janssen) in "The Judgment", the series finale of The Fugitive.

Life and career

Films and television

Cannon served in the United States Army during World War II. Cannon first appeared on television as Master Sergeant Sherman in the sitcom The Phil Silvers Show, also known as You'll Never Get Rich.

He appeared in a 1963 episode of Combat!, titled "The Quiet Warrior", as a member of the American Intelligence.

In 1964, he appeared in the TV Western Gunsmoke, as the evil killer “Pike Beecham” in the episode “Big Man, Big Target” (S10E10).

In 1965, he appeared in an episode of The Alfred Hitchcock Hour. The episode, titled “Completely Foolproof”, originally aired March 29, 1965.

In 1970 Cannon appeared as Roy Harkness on The Men from Shiloh, the retitled name for the final season of TV western The Virginian in the episode titled "Hannah." He played a recurring character – a lawman named Harry Briscoe working for the Bannerman Detective Agency - in the 1971 to 1973 series Alias Smith and Jones. He guest-starred in many series over the years, including Wagon Train, The Defenders, Gunsmoke, Rawhide, Lancer, The Fugitive, Voyage to the Bottom of the Sea, The Untouchables, The Wild, Wild West, East Side/West Side, The Invaders, Combat!, Stoney Burke, and the miniseries Testimony of Two Men (1977) and Top of the Hill (1980). He was cast in several episodes of Murder, She Wrote. His last television acting appearance was on an episode of Law & Order in 1991.

He wore a toupee in most of his later roles. The exception was the Remington Steele episode "Steele in the News" (4 March 1983), in which Cannon played a TV news anchor who only wore his toupee while broadcasting. He also appeared (with his toupee), that same season (#2), of Remington Steele in episode 21 "Hounded Steele". In the second season of Twelve O'Clock High (1965–1966), he played Brig. Gen. Dave Creighton in the 34th episode of the series "RX for a Sick Bird".

Cannon appeared in film roles, often as a cold-eyed villain. His film credits included An American Dream (1966), Cool Hand Luke (1967), Krakatoa, East of Java (1969), The Thousand Plane Raid (1969), Heaven with a Gun (1969), Cotton Comes to Harlem (1970), Lawman (1971), Scorpio (1973), Raise the Titanic (1980), Death Wish II (1982) and Beyond Witch Mountain (1982).

Stage
Cannon was a founding member of Joseph Papp's New York Shakespeare Festival, starring in their productions of The Taming of the Shrew (1956) and Much Ado About Nothing (1961).

Other Appearances
In 1979, Cannon was the presenter in an instructional video demonstrating an MCA DiscoVision video disc player.

In 2019, Anders Enger Jenson sampled the original instruction video and into his music track.

Personal life
Cannon married Alice McCamley, an actress and writer who appeared in Broadway productions including Company and Johnny Johnson. In 1962, he and Colleen Dewhurst starred in his wife's play Great Day in the Morning, based on her childhood in St. Louis.

Cannon died at his home in Hudson, New York, on May 20, 2005, at the age of 83. Alice suffered a debilitating stroke in 2014 and died in 2017.

Filmography

References

External links

1922 births
2005 deaths
American Academy of Dramatic Arts alumni
American male film actors
American male television actors
People from Salmon, Idaho
People from Hudson, New York
Male actors from Los Angeles
United States Army soldiers
United States Army personnel of World War II
20th-century American male actors